Cerianite-(Ce) is a relatively rare oxide mineral, belonging to uraninite group with the formula . It is one of a few currently known minerals containing essential tetravalent cerium, the other examples being stetindite and dyrnaesite-(La).

Occurrence and association
Cerianite-(Ce) is associated with alkaline rocks, mostly nepheline syenites. It may be found in carbonatites. Cerianite-(Ce) associates with minerals of the apatite group, bastnäsite-group minerals, calcite, feldspar, "fluocerite", "hydromica", ilmenite, nepheline, magnetite, "törnebohmite" and tremolite. It is the most simple cerium mineral known.

Notes on chemistry
Beside thorium cerianite-(Ce) may contain trace niobium, yttrium, lanthanum, ytterbium, zirconium and tantalum.

Crystal structure
For details on crystal structure see cerium(IV) oxide. Both ceria and thoria have a fluorite structure.

References

Oxide minerals
Cerium minerals
Lanthanide minerals
Cubic minerals
Minerals in space group 225